Manfred Schädler (8 June 1944 – 28 August 2014) was a Swiss footballer who played in the 1960s as midfielder.

Schädler first played for FC Birsfelden and joined FC Basel's first team for their 1967–68 season under player-manager Helmut Benthaus. Schädler played his domestic league debut for the club in the away game on 9 September 1967 as Basel were defeated 2–4 by Lugano.

Between the years 1967 and 1969 Schädler played a total of four games for Basel without scoring a goal. Two of these games were in the Nationalliga A and two were friendly games.

After his time with Basel, Schädler moved on to play for local club Concordia Basel in a lower league.

References

Sources
 Die ersten 125 Jahre. Publisher: Josef Zindel im Friedrich Reinhardt Verlag, Basel. 
 Verein "Basler Fussballarchiv" Homepage

FC Basel players
FC Concordia Basel players
Swiss men's footballers
Association football midfielders
1944 births
2014 deaths